Pacific Shores is an unincorporated community in Del Norte County, California. The population at the 2010 census was 0 people. It lies at an elevation of 20 feet (6 m). It contains an abundance of streets laid out in more or less a grid. In 1963, the 760-acre area was subdivided into property lots that have been undeveloped since the land became protected by The California Coastal Act of 1976.

See also
California Coastal Commission

References

Unincorporated communities in California
Unincorporated communities in Del Norte County, California
Populated coastal places in California